Altamont is a city in Effingham County, Illinois, United States. The population was 2,216 at the 2020 census. Altamont is part of the Effingham, Illinois Micropolitan Statistical Area.

History

Legend says Griffin Tipsword came to live with the Kickapoo Indians, who were indifferent to the coming of a Caucasian man. Tipsword was white by birth and Native American by adoption. He was a pioneer, a missionary preacher, hunter and medicine man among the Native Americans. Tipsword's family name was Sowards. He called himself Tipsword after coming to Illinois. Tipsword was a veteran of the Revolutionary War, first fighting at Ramsour's Mill in the Carolinas. Griffin died in 1845 and was buried on the banks of Wolff Creek (Tipsword family cemetery, Effingham), leaving three sons, John, Isaac, and Thomas, who left many descendants in the area.

Altamont, the "City of Plain", was laid out in Mound Township, considered the richest and best township in Effingham County - being mostly prairies and farm ground - slightly rolling along Big Creek, Coon Creek, and Second Creek. Mound Township was settled early by German immigrants from the Rhine by way of Pennsylvania and Ohio.

The name "Altamont", like "Mound Township", was bestowed by J.W. Conlogue because of the elevation or "mound" to the northwest. The first part of the word means altitude, the second mount or mound. Conlogue was a romantic, naming his town from Latin.

In History of Effingham County, editor William Henry Perrin wrote in 1883: "The name of Mound Township was bestowed upon it in consequence of what is known as the neighborhood of Blue Mound, a slight elevation of Section 8, which is nearly all a kind of mound, the apex being in the center of the section, and having an altitude of seventy-eight feet above the bed of the Vandalia Railroad, which passes near it. Recently, the Government has erected a signal observatory upon it, some seventy-five to one hundred feet in height, from the top of which one may look across the States of Missouri and Arkansas and see the cowboys watching their herds on the prairies of Texas."

There had been a trading center called Montville on the bank of the creek south of what is now Altamont (Southmore Heights). The postmaster was G.H. Milleville and in 1871 the post office moved to this new place called Altamont. Altamont was organized as a town in 1871.

On August 8, 1872, Altamont adopted the village form of government, with a mayor and four council members. On April 16, 1901, the voters adopted a city form of government and became the City of Altamont.

Geography
Altamont is at  (39.0569861, -88.7474670 ).

Demographics

As of the census of 2000, there were 2,283 people, 899 households, and 608 families in the city. The density was 1,751.6 inhabitants per square mile (678.1/km). The racial makeup was 99.30% White, 0.09% African American, 0.09% Native American, Pacific Islander, and 0.53% from two or more races. Hispanic or Latino of any race were 0.35% of the population.

There were 899 households, of which 33.3% had children under 18 living with them, 54.7% were married couples living together, 10.0% had a female householder with no husband present, and 32.3% were non-families. 29.0% of households were individuals, and 15.6% had someone living alone who was 65 or older. The average household size was 2.44 and the average family 3.02.

In the city 25.9% were under 18, 8.1% from 18 to 24, 24.1% from 25 to 44, 21.8% from 45 to 64, and 20.1% who were 65 or older. The median was 40. For every 100 females, there were 91.8 males. For every 100 females 18 and over, there were 83.1 males.

The median income for a household in the city was $33,186, and the median income for a family was $37,837. Males had a median of $27,639 versus $18,446 for females. The per capita income was $15,478. 4.6% of families and 6.9% of the population were below the poverty line, including 7.8% of those under 18 and 4.5% of those 65 or over.

Arts and culture
The painting, The Moaning Betty (by Andre Wolff), hangs in city hall.

Points of interest

Altamont is home to the Effingham County Fairgrounds, at which the Effingham County Fair has been held annually in the first week of August since 1945. Each year the Effingham County Fair hosts nationally known country singers, a touring rodeo, two ITPA truck and tractor pulls, a queen pageant, a talent show, Standardbred and Thoroughbred races, and a demolition derby. The fairgrounds were once host to the Illinois High School rodeo finals, and currently host the Mill Road Thresherman's gathering and the annual Schützenfest.

The Dr. Charles M. Wright House is a Victorian style home built in 1889 by Dr. C.M. Wright on a  tract on upper North Main Street, where there had been a two-story frame house that was the Wright family home. Wright planned the house himself but the final design (with Wright's approval) was by Edwardsville, Illinois, architect, C. H. Spilman. The builder was Charles Hanker of Toledo, Illinois, for a $17,965 with the owner furnishing the materials.  The total cost, not including furnishings, was approximately $35,000. The house has 18 furnished rooms, including seven bedrooms. On May 8, 1986, the house was put on the National Register of Historic Places.

Ballard Nature Center is a  nature preserve and educational center located east of Altamont. Ernie Ballard donated  for the site of a nature center and the funds to construct a visitor center. He developed a non-profit 501 (C) 3 foundation, in August 1999, to oversee development and management of the center. Construction of the log building began in October 1999. It opened to the public in July 2000. In 2014, the Glen Mathias family donated another 7 acres of land adjacent to the original 210 acres.

Parks and recreation
Altamont has three parks. Gilbert Park, named after Ray Gilbert, Mayor of Altamont from 1971 to 1979, is the largest of Altamont's parks. It has four baseball/softball diamonds, an indoor batting cage, playground equipment and soccer field, and a nine-hole disc golf course.

Schmidt Park has picnic pavilions and playground equipment.

W.C. Klitzing Memorial Heritage Park, often called simply Heritage Park and known to some as "The Train Park," is named after former mayor, school board member, and City Attorney Walter C. Klitzing. It has play equipment, a skateboard area, several covered picnic tables, a basketball court, and restrooms.

There is also "The Triangle," a garden and pavilion space between North Second Street, North Main Street, and West Washington Avenue in downtown Altamont. The Triangle features benches, flower beds, a flagpole, and a covered pavilion which often hosts bake sales and cookouts for community organizations to host fundraisers.

Government
The City of Altamont is governed by an elected mayor and city council of four members. Most recent mayoral and city council elections were in April 2015, those terms all expire in 2019. Currently, Jason Rippetoe is mayor, and the council members are Todd Slingerland, Richard Frailey, Dan Milleville, and Jason Williams.

Education
Altamont Lutheran Interparish School (ALIS) is a private school serving grades K-8. Robinette Flach will assume duties as principal, beginning in July 2015. The cornerstone reads "Immanuel Lutheran School 1959", but the school is now a joint effort of Immanuel, Bethlehem, St. Paul (Blue Point) and Zion Lutheran Churches. Its sports teams are the Rockets.

In 1905, a school building was erected behind Immanuel. Later, in 1928, a school building was purchased for $250, rebuilt, and added to the existing school for a second room. The cornerstone for a new school was laid on July 26, 1959. This building was dedicated on Sunday, January 31, 1960. The cost, including land, was $200,000. The final payment was made in 1966.

In early 1973, St. Paul Blue Point and Immanuel, Altamont formed Altamont Lutheran Interparish School. St. Paul paid $40,000 to add two rooms. The school at St. Paul was discontinued and the students were taken to the Interparish School. St. Paul's school had been in use since 1910.

Zion Lutheran School was organized in 1887. In 1922, the Zion Church building was dedicated so the school was now used exclusively for school classes. In 1931, the Ladies Aid started a fund for a new school. The new school was dedicated in 1938, with electricity, which was also installed in the parsonage at that time. The school closed for a time but reopened in 1956 with Gladys Heiser as teacher. In 1972, Zion school closed and children began attending Altamont Lutheran Interparish School. Zion became a corporate member of ALIS in 1989.

In 1861, the congregation of Bethlehem Lutheran Church erected a church and school building, used until 1867 when the present church was built. In 1873, the school had 23 students. In 1940, English began to be used. The teaching of German ended in 1954.

In December 1958 Bethlehem school building failed a fire inspection. Voters improved the school to keep it open. In 1960 it was decided to build a new school. In 1961, enrollment showed 51 students and the congregation built a parish hall with the school.

On August 26, 1962, Bethlehem Congregation dedicated three classrooms, office, restrooms, parish hall/gymnasium and kitchen. In May 1987, Bethlehem Lutheran School closed and students began attending ALIS in August. In 1988, Bethlehem became a member of ALIS.

To accommodate the additional students from the Bethlehem and Zion congregations a major building project was undertaken in the summer of 1989. Four classrooms were added to the north end of the building and two classrooms, teacher lounge, and storage at the center of the building. The exterior look was completely changed with the addition of a pitched roof. Each grade now has its own room plus a computer lab and a band room.

In 1990, Dr. D. G. Huelskoetter gave the Frog Pond Pre-School to ALIS Frog Pond. Frog Pond is currently taught by Candace Wolff and Kathy Corder.

Altamont Grade School is a public grade school serving grades K-8.  Enrollment at the beginning of 2011 was 546. Its sports teams are the Wildcats. Doug Hill is the principal.

Altamont Community High School is a public high school. The main section of the current building was constructed in the 1950s, and students first occupied the building in 1954. Enrollment at the beginning of 2011 was 285. Its sports teams are the Indians. Jerome "Jerry" Tkachuk is the principal.

Altamont Grade School and Altamont High School are part of Altamont Community Unit School District #10. Dr. Steven Mayerhoffer is the superintendent of schools. The High School athletics compete in the National Trail Conference.

In 2021, Altamont CUSD #10 hired a new superintendent for the school district named David Martin. Martin lived in Nashville, Tennessee and has an extensive education and professional and military background. The town caused backlash because Martin is gay and ultimately pushed him to resign before he had even started.

Infrastructure

Transportation
Altamont is served by Interstate 70, U.S. Route 40, and Illinois Route 128, all of which pass through the city limits. What is now U.S. Route 40 was once known as the National Road.

Amtrak service to Chicago and New Orleans and all points in between can be accessed in Effingham,  to the east.

Community
Altamont Lions Club has been active since 1938. The Lions operate the youth basketball and soccer programs, have an annual fishing rodeo, sponsor a golf tournament, participate in Lions International Candy Day each fall, sponsor local youth for trips abroad and within the U.S., and contribute toward Ballard Nature Center and local parks.

The Altamont Garden Club has planted and cared for many areas around town, as well as pays for and waters over thirty hanging baskets of flowers throughout downtown the spring & summer months. The Garden Club also installed a few dozen lamp posts along the walking path in Schmidt Park.

See also

References

External links

 
 Altamont Living Museum
 Altamont Public Library

Cities in Illinois
Cities in Effingham County, Illinois
Populated places established in 1872
1872 establishments in Illinois